Sweet December is a song by Australian pop punk band, Short Stack. It was released on 11 December 2009 as the lead single from the band's second studio album, This Is Bat Country.

Track listing

Personnel
Short Stack
Shaun Diviney – guitar, vocals
Andy Clemmensen – bass guitar, vocals
Bradie Webb – drums, keyboard

Charts

Weekly charts

Year-end charts

References

2009 songs
2009 singles
Short Stack songs